Joseph Eichberg (born 1935) is an American biologist specializing in signal transduction of the nervous system. He is a professor emeritus in the department of biology and biochemistry at University of Houston. Eichberg completed his Ph.D. at Harvard University.

References

External links 

 

Living people
1935 births
20th-century American biologists
21st-century American biologists
Harvard University alumni
University of Houston faculty